Fasta Åland ( or , meaning mainland Åland) is the largest and most populous island of Åland, an autonomous province of Finland. The island is home to the provincial capital Mariehamn. About ninety percent of the archipelago's population lives on Fasta Åland. Even at the minimum estimate, Fasta Åland is Finland's largest and most populous island, with about 27,000 people. Its highest point is 129 metres (423 feet). 

On the east side of Fasta Åland is a large bay, Lumparn, which is now believed to be the impact crater from a meteorite impact about one billion years ago.

References 

Islands of Åland
Aland, Fasta